The Oregoniidae are a family of crabs, formerly included in the family Majidae. It contains the four genera Chionoecetes, Hyas, Macroregonia, and Oregonia.

References

Majoidea
Decapod families